Lascelles Brown (born October 12, 1974 in May Pen) is a Jamaican-born Canadian bobsledder who has competed for three countries since starting his career in 1999. Competing in three Winter Olympics, he is the first Jamaican-born athlete to win a Winter Olympic medal.

Brown was a member of the Jamaica national bobsled team from 1999 to 2004, competing at the 2002 Winter Olympics in Salt Lake City, as a brakeman for Winston Watt. The Jamaican duo set the track push record during those games. He continued training for bobsleigh at Calgary's Canada Olympic Park, where he met and married his wife Kara, a Canadian. As of 2011, they have three daughters and a son together.

He applied for Canadian citizenship on July 28, 2005; it was awarded to him by special exemption just prior to the 2006 Winter Olympics, enabling him to compete for Canada at the games in Turin. Brown is currently acting as the brakeman for Lyndon Rush in both the 2-man and 4-man event. Brown competed at the 2010 Winter Olympics together with Rush on their home track at the Whistler Sliding Centre, winning bronze in the four-man event. Brown had previously been competing with North America's most decorated bobsleigh pilot Pierre Lueders but the two had a falling out and no longer compete together. Brown recently said that "I'd only do it if Jesus asked" when questioned if he would ever compete with Lueders again.

Bobsleigh Canada coach Gerd Grimme described Brown as one of the top three brakesmen in the world, along with Beat Hefti of Switzerland and Germany's Kevin Kuske.

Beginning the 2010 season Brown became a competitor for Monaco, and was partnered with Monégasque Patrice Servelle.  He stopped representing Monaco, returning as a competitor for Canada in 2012.

Results
In the 2004–2005 season, Pierre Lueders and Brown won a world title, five World Cup medal finishes in two-man and three medal finishes in four-man.

In the 2006 Olympic Games, Lueders and Brown won a silver medal in the two-man event. Brown also has a complete set of medals at the FIBT World Championships with gold in the two-man event (2005), a silver in the four-man event (2007) and a bronze in the four-man event (2005).

In the 2010 Olympic Winter Games held in Vancouver, BC Lascelles Brown won the bronze medal along with his teammates Lyndon Rush, Chris Le Bihan and David Bissett.

References

External links
 
 USA Today February 23, 2006 article on Brown's silver medal.
 Bobsleigh two-man world championship medalists since 1931
 Bobsleigh two-man Olympic medalists 1932–56 and since 1964
 Bobsleigh four-man world championship medalists since 1930

1974 births
Bobsledders at the 2002 Winter Olympics
Bobsledders at the 2006 Winter Olympics
Bobsledders at the 2010 Winter Olympics
Bobsledders at the 2014 Winter Olympics
Bobsledders at the 2018 Winter Olympics
Canadian male bobsledders
Monegasque male bobsledders
Naturalized citizens of Canada
Jamaican male bobsledders
Jamaican emigrants to Canada
People from Clarendon Parish, Jamaica
Olympic bobsledders of Canada
Olympic bobsledders of Jamaica
Olympic silver medalists for Canada
Olympic bronze medalists for Canada
Olympic medalists in bobsleigh
Medalists at the 2010 Winter Olympics
Medalists at the 2006 Winter Olympics
Black Canadian sportspeople
Living people